The Secretary of Transportation and Public Works of Puerto Rico leads the Department of Transportation and Public Works of Puerto Rico and leads all efforts related to transportation and public works in Puerto Rico. As of 2022, the current secretary is Eileen Vélez Vega.

References

External links
  

Puerto Rico Department of Transportation and Public Works
Council of Secretaries of Puerto Rico